Norridgewock was the name of both an Indigenous village and a band of the Abenaki ("People of the Dawn") Native Americans/First Nations, an Eastern Algonquian tribe of the United States and Canada. The French of New France called the village Kennebec. The tribe occupied an area in the interior of Maine.  During colonial times, this area was territory disputed between British and French colonists, and was set along the claimed western border of Acadia, the western bank of the Kennebec River.

Archaeological evidence has identified several different sites associated with the settlement known as Norridgewock.  The last one, where the French Jesuit priest Sebastian Rale had a mission, is today called Old Point, and is located in Madison.  Other sites are located nearby in Starks and the present-day town of Norridgewock.  Three of these historically and archaeologically significant areas have been collectively designated as the Norridgewock Archaeological District, a National Historic Landmark District.

Norridgewock village
Norridgewock is a corruption of the word Nanrantsouak, meaning "people of the still water between the rapids". Their principal village, also called Norridgewock, was located near  on a plateau within a broad bend of the Kennebec River, opposite its confluence with the Sandy River. The fort's walls faced the major points of the compass. Two streets connected the gates, forming an open square at the center marked by a large cross. The stockade enclosed 26 cabins "built much after the English manner"—probably of logs. Canoes were beached along the river, although paddles were stored in the cabins. Extensive fields were cleared nearby for cultivation of maize, wheat, beans, pumpkins and squash. Twice a year, summer and winter, the tribe spent a few months at the seashore catching fish, seals, clams, oysters and seafowl.

France claimed the Kennebec River because it provided a potential route to invade Quebec (as Benedict Arnold would demonstrate in 1775). English colonists claimed the St. George River because they held deeds, even though the sachems who signed them often believed they were only granting the right to use the land for hunting, fishing or safe passage. The French insisted that the sachems were not empowered to sell land, since the Abenaki territory belonged to the entire tribe. France and England were at peace, and New France could not take overt action against the settlements (and particularly their alarming blockhouses) in the disputed area. Instead, the French government secretly engaged the Indians, guided by their French Jesuit missionaries, to hinder the expansion of English colonists. Missionaries with a dual loyalty to church and king were embedded within Abenaki bands on the Penobscot, St. Croix and Saint John rivers. However, Norridgewock Village was considered Quebec's predominant advance guard.

In 1694, Father Sébastien Rale (or Rasle) arrived at Norridgewock to establish a Jesuit mission, the first school in Maine. He built a chapel of bark in 1698, and despite objections from the medicine men, Rale converted most of the inhabitants to Roman Catholicism. The chapel burned in 1705, but it was replaced with a church in 1720. Forty Abenaki youths in cassocks and surplices served as acolytes. In a 1722 letter written to John Goffe, the church was described by Johnson Harmon and Joseph Heath as:

 ... a large handsome log building adorned with many pictures and toys to please the Indians ...

Speaking the Abenaki language fluently, Father Rale immersed himself in Indian affairs. His "astonishing influence over their minds" raised suspicions that he was inciting hostility toward the Protestant British colonists, whom he considered heretics.

King William's War

Raid on Oyster River 
During King William's War, on July 18, 1694, French soldier Claude-Sébastien de Villieu with about 250 Abenakis from Norridgewock under command of their sagamore (paramount chief), Bomazeen (or Bomoseen) raided the English colonial settlement of Durham, New Hampshire, in the "Oyster River Massacre".  The French and Abenakis killed 45 English settlers and took 49 more captive, burning half of the village, including five garrisons. They destroyed the crops and killed all of the livestock, causing famine and destitution for the survivors.

Queen Anne's War
 
When Queen Anne's War broke out, with New France and New England again fighting over the border between New England and Acadia, Massachusetts Governor Joseph Dudley arranged a conference with tribal representatives in 1703 to propose that they remain neutral. On the contrary, however, the Norridgewock tribe in August joined a larger force of French and Indians, commanded by Alexandre Leneuf de Beaubassin, to attack Wells in the Northeast Coast Campaign. Father Rale was widely suspected of inciting the tribe against English colonists because their settlements and blockhouses encroached on Abenaki land (and so uncomfortably close to Quebec), but also because they were Protestant and therefore heretics. Governor Dudley put a price on his head. In the winter of 1705, 275 English colonial militia under the command of Colonel Winthrop Hilton were dispatched to seize Rale and sack the village. Warned in time, the priest escaped into the woods with his papers, but the militia burned the village and church.

Raid on Wells (1703) 
As part of the Northeast Coast Campaign (1703), 500 Indians, including those from Norridgewock and a few French, commanded by Alexandre Leneuf de Beaubassin, raided Wells on August 10 and 11, 1703.

Raid on Norridgewock (1705) 
In retaliation, there was a bounty put on Father Rale. Finding the village deserted in the winter of 1705 because its occupants, including Rale had been warned of an impending attack, Colonel Winthrop Hilton ordered his 275 English colonial militia to burn the village and the church.

With the Treaty of Utrecht and Treaty of Portsmouth (1713), however, peace was restored between France and England. Terms of the treaty required that the French yield Acadia to the English. The boundary of Acadia remained in dispute. The two nations disagreed, and consequently imperial boundaries between Quebec and the Province of Massachusetts Bay remained unclear and disputed until the Treaty of Paris in 1763.

In 1713, the Norridgewocks had sought peace with English at the Treaty of Portsmouth, and accepted the convenience of trading posts operated by English settlers on their land (though they protested the tendency of the settlers to cheat them). After all, beaver and other skins could be exchanged for cheap goods following a journey of one or two days, when travel to Quebec up the Kennebec, with its rapids and portages, required over 15 days.

Father Rale's War 

But their acceptance of English settlers faded as Rale instigated the tribe against the encroachment of houses and blockhouses that followed trading posts. He taught the Abenaki that their territory should be held in trust for their children. On July 28, 1721, 250 Abenakis in 90 canoes delivered a letter at Georgetown addressed to Governor Samuel Shute, demanding that English settlers quit Abenaki lands. Otherwise, they would be killed and their settlements destroyed.

Raid on Norridgewock (1722) 
In response, Norridgewock was raided in January 1722 by 300 English colonial militia under Colonel Thomas Westbrook. They discovered the village almost deserted, with the gates wide open. The tribe was gone hunting. Troops searched for Rale but found only his papers, including letters from New France Governor-general Vaudreuil promising ammunition for Abenaki raids on English colonial settlements. The tribe retaliated for the invasion by attacking settlements below them on the Kennebec, burning Brunswick on June 13, 1722. Some of the raids were accompanied by Rale, who would occasionally allow himself to be seen from houses and blockhouses under siege. On July 25, 1722, Massachusetts Governor Samuel Shute declared war on the eastern Indians.

Battle of Norridgewock (1724)

During Father Rale's War, at about 3:00 pm on August 23, 1724 (N. S.), a force of English colonial militia attacked Norridgewock for the last time. A force of 208 militia had left Fort Richmond (now Richmond) and divided, leaving about 80 militiamen including three Mohawks under the command of Captain Jeremiah Moulton. His militia quietly approached the village, which at that time no longer had a stockade. A startled Indian emerging from a cabin gave a war whoop, then darted back inside to get his musket. Norridgewock women and children ran from houses to swim or ford across the river and up into the woods. In the confusion, about 60 braves fired guns wildly but did little harm. At that point the militia, ordered to withhold fire until after the enemy's first volley, took aim—with deadly effect. The warriors fired again, then fled across the river, leaving 26 dead and 14 wounded. Bomazeen (or Bomaseen), the sachem, who with Sebastien de Villieu had led 250 Abenakis to Durham, New Hampshire on July 18, 1694, for the Oyster River Massacre, was shot fording the Kennebec at a place thereafter called Bomazeen Rips. From a cabin, old Chief Mogg shot one of the Mohawks, whose brother then shot him. Meanwhile, from another cabin Father Rale was firing at the militia. Refusing to surrender, he was shot through the head while reloading his gun.

Scalps of the dead were collected for bounties in Boston. The militia plundered  of gunpowder, together with a few guns, blankets and kettles, before returning to their whaleboats at Taconic Falls. One of the Mohawks, a brave named Christian, slipped back to set the village and church on fire, then rejoined the militia. The 150 survivors of Norridgewock returned the next day to bury the dead. Subsequently, most abandoned the area and, "in deplorable condition", relocated to Saint-François and Bécancour in Quebec. A few years later, however, many survivors returned to the Upper Kennebec from their refuge in Quebec, and a Jesuit missionary, Jacques de Sirenne, was assigned to their spiritual care.

Legacy 
Norridgewock Village is the setting for the 1836 poem Mogg Megone by John Greenleaf Whittier.

Archaeological investigation of the Old Point area has identified three separate areas that are historically associated with the appellation "Norridgewock". The principal site at Old Point has long been well documented, and was listed on the National Register of Historic Places in 1973 as "Old Point and Sebastian Rale Monument", recognizing not just the site itself, but also the placement of a commemorative marker at the site in 1833. This site was first professionally excavated in 1983, with finds matching historical descriptions of very early references to Norridgewock. Extensive excavation in 1990 collected 15,000 artifacts from the Late Woodland and early contact periods, and identified the site of at least one longhouse. Another site, located nearer the confluence of the two rivers in Starks, also yielded evidence of habitation during the Late Woodland period. This site showed evidence of repeated flooding, suggesting that the habitation areas were later moved to the higher grounds of Tracy Farm and Old Point. These three sites were collectively designated a National Historic Landmark District and added to the National Register of Historic Places in 1993.

See also
List of National Historic Landmarks in Maine
National Register of Historic Places listings in Somerset County, Maine

References
Endnotes

Texts
 
 
 Prins, Harald E.L (with B. Bourque), 1987, "Norridgewock: Village Translocation on the New England Acadian Frontier." Man in the Northeast, No. 33, pp. 137–58.
 
 Matteo Binasco. "Few, Uncooperative, and Endangered: The Troubled Activity of the Roman Catholic missionaries in Acadia (1610-1710)", in Royal Nova Scotia Historical Society, Journal, vol.10 (2007), pp. 147–162.

External links
 History of Madison, Maine
 History of Norridgewock, Maine
 Norridgewock Indian Village & Monument
 Saint Francis Mission

Abenaki communities
Pre-statehood history of Maine
Native American tribes in Maine
French and Indian War forts
Algonquian ethnonyms
First Nations history in Quebec
Somerset County, Maine
Forts on the National Register of Historic Places in Maine
National Register of Historic Places in Somerset County, Maine